Frederick Rodriguez (born April 15, 1981) is a Filipino professional basketball player for the Iloilo United Royals of the Maharlika Pilipinas Basketball League (MPBL). He played for the Philippine Patriots in ASEAN Basketball League (ABL). Rodriguez is a former player of the Letran Knights as the team captain that championed in NCAA on 2003 and 2005 and also played for Toyota Balintawak in the Philippine Basketball League for 5 years.

Career
Rodriguez played in Letran for 4 years and helped them to win the championship in 2003 and 2005. He was then selected to represent the country with the RP-Harbour Centre in the SEABA Championship in Indonesia. Rodriguez also played in the Southeast Asian Games in Nakhon, Ratchasima in Thailand in December 2007.

During the 2006 PBA Draft, he went undrafted. He was then signed by the Burger King Whoppers as a free agent in 2009. After his PBA career, he played with Philippine Patriots in ASEAN Basketball League. Rodriguez was previously seen on UNTV Cup playing for House of Representatives team and was signed as practice player for GlobalPort Batang Pier in PBA.

References

External links
 http://www.pba.ph/teams/player/254

1981 births
Living people
Air21 Express players
Barangay Ginebra San Miguel players
Meralco Bolts players
Letran Knights basketball players
Philippines men's national basketball team players
Filipino men's basketball players
Power forwards (basketball)
Shooting guards
Small forwards
Southeast Asian Games gold medalists for the Philippines
Southeast Asian Games competitors for the Philippines
Southeast Asian Games medalists in basketball
Competitors at the 2007 Southeast Asian Games
Zamboanga Valientes players